Frank Hawkins may refer to:

 Frank Hawkins (born 1959), American football player
 Frank Hawkins (gymnast) (born 1897), British Olympic gymnast
 Frank Hawkins (politician) (1897–1971), Australian politician
 Frank Hawkins (rugby union) (1885–1960), British rugby union player